NFIW may stand for:

 National Federation of Indian Women, women's organisation in India
 National Federation of Insurance Workers, a former British trade union federation